Șeica Mare (Transylvanian Saxon: Martscheelken) is a commune located in Sibiu County, Transylvania, Romania. It is composed of six villages: Boarta (Michelsdorf; Mihályfalva), Buia (Bell; Bólya), Mighindoala (Engenthal; Ingodály), Petiș (Petersdorf; Kispéterfalva), Șeica Mare, and Ștenea (Stein; Isztina). Calvaser (Kaltwasser; Hidegvíz) was also a village until the late 20th century, when it was absorbed by Șeica Mare village.

Geography 

The commune is situated on the Transylvanian Plateau, on the banks of the river Vișa; the rivers Calva and Râpa flow into the Vișa in Șeica Mare.

Located in the north-central part of the county, the commune is crossed by national road .

The Șeica Mare train station serves the CFR 
rail line 208, which runs north from Sibiu to Copșa Mică.

Demographics 

At the 2011 census, Șeica Mare had 4,470 inhabitants. Of those, 88.8% were Romanians, 6% were Hungarians, 4.2% were Roma, and 1% were Germans (more specifically Transylvanian Saxons).

Natives 

 Farkas Bolyai (1775–1856), mathematician
 Cornel Oțelea (born 1940), handball player

Villages 

Buia village was first attested in a document of 1269, under the name of poss Bulla. In 1918, it had 1167 residents, of whom 736 were Romanians and the rest Germans and Hungarians. By 2002, the population was down to 634: 516 Romanians, 104 Hungarians, and three Roma. The village is in the southern part of the commune, linked to Șeica Mare by an  stretch of county road. Farkas Bolyai was born there in 1775.

Mighindoala (meaning "Angels' Valley") is a small village in the Șeica Mare commune.

As recently as 1975, the village had in excess of 50 houses, but was gradually deserted after the communist regime withdrew infrastructure such as teachers and doctors. As of 2004, there were only four people left in this village. There were only about ten buildings standing, including the Protestant church. The Romanian Orthodox church no longer has a roof, and is now abandoned.

The only economic activity is agriculture, very much based on the traditional farming of sheep, cows, and horses.

Gallery

References 

Communes in Sibiu County
Localities in Transylvania